Echinacea  is a genus of herbaceous flowering plants in the daisy family. It has ten species, which are commonly called coneflowers. They are found only in eastern and central North America, where they grow in moist to dry prairies and open wooded areas. They have large, showy heads of composite flowers, blooming in summer. The generic name is derived from the Greek word , meaning "sea urchin", due to the spiny central disk. These flowering plants and their parts have different uses. Some species are cultivated in gardens for their showy flowers. Two of the species, E. tennesseensis and E. laevigata, are listed in the United States as endangered species.

Echinacea purpurea is used in traditional medicine. Although commonly sold as a dietary supplement, there is insufficient scientific evidence that Echinacea products are effective or safe for improving health or treating any disease.

Description 

Echinacea species are herbaceous, drought-tolerant perennial plants growing up to 140 cm or 4 feet, in height. They grow from taproots, except E. purpurea, which grows from a short caudex with fibrous roots. They have erect stems that in most species are unbranched. Both the basal and cauline (stem) leaves are arranged alternately. The leaves are normally hairy with a rough texture, having uniseriate trichomes (1–4 rings of cells) but sometimes they lack hairs. The basal leaves and the lower stem leaves have petioles, and as the leaves progress up the stem the petioles often decrease in length. The leaf blades in different species may have one, three or five nerves. Some species have linear to lanceolate leaves, and others have elliptic- to ovate-shaped leaves; often the leaves decrease in size as they progress up the stems. Leaf bases gradually increase in width away from the petioles or the bases are rounded to heart shaped. Most species have leaf margins that are entire, but sometimes they are dentate or serrate.

The flowers are collected together into single rounded heads at the ends of long peduncles. The inflorescences have crateriform to hemispheric shaped involucres which are 12–40 mm wide. The phyllaries, or bracts below the flower head, are persistent and number 15–50. The phyllaries are produced in a 2–4 series. The receptacles are hemispheric to conic. The paleae (chaffs on the receptacles of many Asteraceae) have orange to reddish purple ends, and are longer than the disc corollas. The paleae bases partially surrounding the cypselae, and are keeled with the apices abruptly constricted to awn-like tips. The ray florets number 8–21 and the corollas are dark purple to pale pink, white, or yellow. The tubes of the corolla are hairless or sparsely hairy, and the laminae are spreading, reflexed, or drooping in habit and linear to elliptic or obovate in shape. The abaxial faces of the laminae are glabrous or moderately hairy. The flower heads have typically 200–300 fertile, bisexual disc florets but some have more. The corollas are pinkish, greenish, reddish-purple or yellow and have tubes shorter than the throats. The pollen is normally yellow in most species, but usually white in E. pallida. The three or four-angled fruits (cypselae), are tan or bicolored with a dark brown band distally.  The pappi are persistent and variously crown-shaped with 0 to 4 or more prominent teeth. x = 11.

Like all members of the sunflower family, the flowering structure is a composite inflorescence, with rose-colored (rarely yellow or white) florets arranged in a prominent, somewhat cone-shaped head – "cone-shaped" because the petals of the outer ray florets tend to point downward (are reflexed) once the flower head opens, thus forming a cone. Plants are generally long lived, with distinctive flowers. The common name "cone flower"  comes from the characteristic center "cone" at the center of the flower head.

Taxonomy 

The first Echinacea species were discovered by European explorers in forests of southeastern North America during the 18th century. The genus Echinacea was then formally described by Linnaeus in 1753, and this specimen as one of five species of Rudbeckia, Rudbeckia purpurea. Conrad Moench  subsequently reclassified it in 1794 as the separate but related genus, Echinacea, with the single species Echinacea purpurea, so that the botanical authority is given as (L.) Moench. In 1818, Nuttall, using the original name, described a variety of Rudbeckia purpurea, which he named Rudbeckia purpurea var serotina. In 1836, De Candolle elevated this variety to a species in its own right, as Echinacea serotina (Nutt.) DC, by which time four species of the genus Echinacea were recognised.

Historically, there has been much confusion over the taxonomic treatment of the genus, largely due to the ease with which the taxa hybridize with introgression where species ranges overlap, and high morphological variation. Furthermore it was discovered that the type specimen for Echinacea purpurea (L) Moench  was not the one originally described by Linnaeus, but rather that described by De Candolle as Echinacea serotina (Nutt.) DC.

Subdivision 

Many taxonomic treatments of the genus Echinacea have recorded varying numbers of subordinate taxa, ranging between 2 and 11. One of the most widely adopted schemes was that of McGregor (1968), which included nine species, of which two, E. angustifolia DC and E. paradoxa (Norton) Britton, were further divided into two varietals. Treatments that include ten species, differ by the addition of E. serotina (Nutt.) DC. Alternative classification include with four species and eight subspecies, and two subgenera with four species, has been proposed, based on morphology alone, but has proved controversial. This recognised subgenus Echinacea, with the single species E. purpurea, and subgenus Pallida, with three species, E. atrorubens, E. laevigata and E. pallida. In this scheme, other taxa are reduced to variety rank, e.g. E. atrorubens var. neglecta. Subsequently, McGregor's classification was preserved in the Flora of North America (2006). 

DNA analysis has been applied to determine the number of Echinacea species, allowing clear distinctions among species based on chemical differences in root metabolites. The research concluded that of the 40 genetically diverse populations of Echinacea studied, there were nine to ten distinct species.

Species 
Plants of the World Online gives nine accepted species, and World Flora Online gives ten:
Echinacea angustifolia  – Narrow-leaf coneflower
Echinacea atrorubens  – Topeka purple coneflower
Echinacea laevigata  – Smooth coneflower, smooth purple coneflower
Echinacea pallida  – Pale purple coneflower
Echinacea paradoxa  – Yellow coneflower, Bush's purple coneflower
Echinacea purpurea  – Purple coneflower, eastern purple coneflower
Echinacea sanguinea  – Sanguine purple coneflower
Echinacea serotina  – Narrow-leaved purple coneflower
Echinacea simulata  – Wavyleaf purple coneflower
Echinacea tennesseensis  – Tennessee coneflower
These two databases differ in their treatment of E. serotina (Nutt.) DC. , the former considering this as a synonym of E. purpurea and the latter as a distinct species.

Former classification 

 Rudbeckia 
 Brauneria (1790)

Etymology 

Moench named the genus Echinacea, from the Greek word   for hedgehog or sea-urchin, in recognition that in the seed stage, the cone has spiny projections.

Distribution and habitat 

Echinacea is restricted to North America, east of the Rocky Mountains, and in the Atlantic drainage area, predominantly the Great Plains and central United States and adjacent areas of Canada. The genus range is from Saskatchewan in the north to almost the Gulf of Mexico in Louisiana and Texas in the south, and from the Ohio oak savannas, glades of Tennessee and the Carolinas in the east, to the Rocky Mountain foothills in the west.

Conservation 

Natural populations of Echinacea are threatened by over-harvesting of wild specimens for the herbal product trade and modification of their habitats by human. Major reductions in the size of populations of E. laevigata and E. tennesseensis have led to their classification as endangered species. E. tennesseensis had recovered sufficiently by 2011, that it was removed from the list.

Cultivation 

Many species of Echinacea are cultivated for commercial use, while others, notably E. purpurea, E. angustifolia, and E. pallida, are grown as ornamental plants in gardens. Many cultivars exist, and many of them are asexually propagated to keep them true to type.

Uses 

Echinacea has long been used as a traditional medicine.

History 

Echinacea angustifolia was widely used by the North American Indigenous peoples as folk medicine, with archaeological evidence dating back to the 18th century. Traditional use included external application (insect bites, burns, wounds), chewing of roots (throat and tooth infections) and internal use (cough, pain, snake bites, stomach cramps). Some Plains tribes used Echinacea for cold symptoms. The Kiowa used it for coughs and sore throats, the Cheyenne for sore throats, the Pawnee for headaches, and many tribes including the Lakota used it as a pain medication. Early European settlers noticed this and began to develop their own uses. According to Wallace Sampson, its modern use for the common cold began when a Swiss herbal supplement maker was told that Echinacea was used for cold prevention by Native American tribes who lived in the area of South Dakota. The first preparation was Meyers Blood Purifier (c. 1880), which was promoted for neuralgia, rattlesnake bites and rheumatism. By the start of the 20th century it was the most common herbal remedy in America. Commercial cultivation began in Germany in the late 1930s, and in Switzerland in 1950, by A. Vogel. Soon chemists and pharmacologists began the task of identifying potentially active ingredients and their properties. These included alyklamides, cichoric acid, echinacoside, ketoalkenes and polysaccharides. Extracts appeared to exhibit immunostimulant properties and were mainly promoted for the prevention and treatment of colds, influenza and sepsis. Despite many different preparations and hundreds of publications, no exact identification of a truly active ingredient has been identified.

Infectious diseases 

Echinacea preparations have been advocated as antimicrobials and immunomodulators. Echinacea extracts inhibited growth of three species of trypanosomatids: Leishmania donovani, Leishmania major, and Trypanosoma brucei.

While one 2014 systematic review found that Echinacea products are not effective to treat or prevent the common cold, a 2016 meta-analysis found tentative evidence that use of Echinacea extracts reduced the risk of repeated respiratory infections. A 2015 monograph by the European Medicines Agency stated that oral consumption of "expressed juice" or dried expressed juice of Echinacea could prevent or reduce symptoms of a common cold at its onset. As of 2020, the benefit, if any, appears to be small and thus of little utility.

Side effects 

When taken by mouth, Echinacea does not usually cause side effects, but may have undesirable interactions with various drugs prescribed for diseases, such as heart disease, bleeding, and autoimmune diseases, such as rheumatoid arthritis, lupus, or psoriasis. Although there are no specific case reports of drug interactions with Echinacea, safety about taking Echinacea supplements is not well-understood, with possibilities that it may cause side effects, such as nausea, stomach upset or diarrhea, and that it may have adverse reactions with other medications. One of the most extensive and systematic studies to review the safety of Echinacea products concluded that overall, "adverse events are rare, mild and reversible," with the most common symptoms being "gastrointestinal and skin-related." Such side effects include nausea, abdominal pain, diarrhea, itch, and rash. Echinacea has also been linked to allergic reactions, including asthma, shortness of breath, and one case of anaphylaxis. Muscle and joint pain has been associated with Echinacea, but it may have been caused by cold or flu symptoms for which the Echinacea products were administered. There are isolated case reports of rare and idiosyncratic reactions including thrombocytopenic purpura, leucopenia, hepatitis, kidney failure, and atrial fibrillation, although it is not clear that these were due to Echinacea itself. Up to 58 drugs or supplements may interact with Echinacea.

As a matter of manufacturing safety, one investigation by an independent-consumer testing laboratory found that five of eleven selected retail Echinacea products failed quality testing. Four of the failing products contained levels of phenols below the potency level stated on the labels. One failing product was contaminated with lead.

Children under 12 years old 

The European Herbal Medicinal Products Committee (HMPC) and the UK Herbal Medicines Advisory Committee (HMAC) recommended against the use of Echinacea-containing products in children under the age of 12. Manufacturers re-labelled all oral Echinacea products that had product licenses for children with a warning that they should not be given to children under 12 as a precautionary measure.

Pregnancy 

Although research has not found increased risk of birth defects associated with use of Echinacea during the first trimester, it is recommended that pregnant women should avoid Echinacea products until stronger safety supporting evidence becomes available.

Lactation 

It is recommended that women breastfeeding should use caution with Echinacea products due to insufficient safety information available.

General precaution 

The U.S. Food and Drug Administration recommends precaution about using dietary supplements because some products may not be risk free under certain circumstances or may interact with prescription and over-the-counter medicines.

As with any herbal preparation, individual doses of Echinacea may vary significantly in chemical composition. Inconsistent process control in manufactured echinacea products may involve poor inter- and intra-batch homogeneity, species or plant part differences, variable extraction methods, and contamination or adulteration with other products, leading to potential for substantial product variability.

Research 

Echinacea products vary widely in composition. They contain different species (E. purpurea, E. angustifolia, E. pallida), different plant segments (roots, flowers, extracts), different preparations (extracts and expressed juice), and different chemical compositions which complicate understanding of a potential effect.
Well-controlled clinical trials are limited and low in quality, with little scientific evidence that Echinacea supplement products are useful for treating any disease.

According to Cancer Research UK, "There is no scientific evidence to show that echinacea can help treat, prevent or cure cancer in any way. Some therapists have claimed that echinacea can help relieve side effects from cancer treatments such as chemotherapy and radiotherapy, but this has not been proven either."

Although there are multiple scientific reviews and meta-analyses published on the supposed immunological effects of Echinacea, there is significant variability of products used among studies, leading to low-quality or no evidence for efficacy and safety, leading to considerable controversy. Consequently, regulatory authorities, such as the United States Food and Drug Administration, have not approved Echinacea products as safe and effective for any health or therapeutic purpose.

See also 
 List of ineffective cancer treatments

References

Bibliography

Books and documents 

 
 
 
 
 
 
 
 

Historical sources
 
 , see also Species Plantarum

Chapters 

 
 , in 
 , in 
 , in

Articles 

 
 
 
 

Taxonomy and phylogeny
 
 
 
 
 
 

Traditional medicine

Websites 

 
 * 

 
 
 
 
 
 
 
 

Databases and floras

External links

 
Plants used in traditional Native American medicine
Asteraceae genera
Flora of North America